Alphacrinus is an extinct genus of crinoids which existed during the early Ibexian period. It was named by Thomas E. Guensburg in 2010, and placed into its own family, Alphacrinidae. The type species is Alphacrinus mansfieldi.

References

Prehistoric crinoid genera
Fossil taxa described in 2010